The Battle of Darbytown and New Market Roads ( or Johnson's Farm or Four Mile Creek) was an engagement between Union and Confederate forces during the American Civil War, which took place on October 7, 1864, in Henrico County, Virginia, as part of the Richmond-Petersburg Campaign.

Background

The Richmond-Petersburg Campaign (June 15, 1864 – March 25, 1865) was a Union effort to capture the city of Petersburg, Virginia, from Confederate forces under the command of Confederate General Robert E. Lee. During the Battle of Chaffin's Farm, Union forces captured Fort Harrison from the Confederates on September 30. This prompted Lee to order an offensive on the right flank of the Union forces, which were under the command of Lt. Gen. Ulysses S. Grant, on October 7.

Opposing forces

Union

Confederate

Battle
The Union defensive lines, commanded by Brig. Gen. August V. Kautz and Maj. Gen. David B. Birney, were positioned along the length of New Market Road, with further Union cavalry defending Darbytown Road.

The initial Confederate attack, commanded by Maj. Gens. Robert Hoke and Charles W. Field, was successful in dislodging the Union Cavalry from Darbytown Road. The cavalry forces routed from the field, the confederates then attacked the Union defensive lines on the New Market Road. During this attack, the Confederate Texas Brigade's commander Brig. Gen. John Gregg was killed, and the attack was repulsed. The engagement resulted with a Confederate withdrawal to Richmond and thus Union victory.

References
 Kennedy, Frances H., ed., The Civil War Battlefield Guide, 2nd ed., Houghton Mifflin Co., 1998, .
 John Gregg's wife, Mary Francis Garth
 National Park Service battle summary
 CWSAC Report Update and Resurvey:Individual Battlefield Profiles

Notes

Darbytown and New Market Roads
Darbytown and New Market Roads
Darbytown and New Market Roads
Darbytown
Darbytown and New Market Roads
Darbytown and New Market Roads
1864 in Virginia
October 1864 events